Synanthedon geranii is a moth of the family Sesiidae. It is found in Greece.

The wingspan is 20–21 mm.

The larvae feed on Geranium macrorrhizum.

References

Moths described in 1997
Sesiidae
Moths of Europe